An accessory fruit is a fruit that contains tissue derived from plant parts other than the ovary. In other words, the flesh of the fruit develops not from the floral ovary, but from some adjacent tissue exterior to the carpel (for example, from receptacles or sepal). As a general rule, the accessory fruit is a combination of several floral organs, including the ovary. In contrast, true fruit forms exclusively from the ovary of the flower.

Accessory fruits are usually indehiscent, meaning fruits that do not split open to release seeds when they have reached maturity.

Terminology

Alternative terms for accessory fruit are false fruit, spurious fruit, pseudofruit, or pseudocarp. These are older terms for accessory fruit that have been criticized as "inapt", and are not used by some botanists today.

From which organs is the fruit formed?

Fertilization of accessory fruits induces the development of other organs; flower peduncle in cashew apple, calyx, bracts in pineapple, etc. 

The following are examples of accessory fruits listed by the plant organ from which the accessory tissue is derived:

 Hypanthium-derived: pomes (e.g. apple and pear)
 Perianth-derived: anthocarps of the Nyctaginaceae
 Receptacle-derived: fig, mulberry, pineapple, and strawberry
 Sepal-derived: Gaultheria procumbens and Syzygium jambos
Fruit with fleshy seeds, such as pomegranate or mamoncillo, are not considered to be accessory fruits.

Examples

Apples and pears 

The part of apples and pears that is consumed is, in fact, the hypathium, tissue. The ovary is the papery core that surrounds the apple seeds. As the hypanthium ripens it forms the tissues that we consume.

Roses 
For roses, the hypanthium is the tissue that composes the edible part of rosehips (basically, the fruit of roses and eglantines). Roses and apples are members of the rosacea family; the fact that they have the same fruity morphology is a major consideration in placingg them in the same taxonomic family.

Strawberries 

The edible part of the strawberry is formed, as part of the ripening process, from the receptacle of the strawberry flower. The true fruits (hence, containing the seeds) are the roughly 200 pips (which are, technically, achenes, a true fruit that contains a single seed from a single ovary). These pips dot the exterior of the strawberry.

Cashews 

The cashew nut forms in an oval- or pear-shaped structure, a hypocarpium, that develops from the pedicel and the receptacle of the cashew flower. The true fruit of the cashew tree is a kidney–shaped drupe that grows at the end of the cashew apple and that contains the cashew nut.

Pineapple 

The pineapple is formed when 50 to 200 unpollinated flowers coalesce in a spiral arrangement— the flowers form individually and then fuse as a single 'multiple fruit'. The ovaries develop into berries and the fruit forms around an intercalary spike. The intercalary inflorescence (cluster of flowers) results when the terminal cluster of flowers are left behind by the growth of the main axis of the plant. Each polygonal area on the pineapple's surface is an individual flower.

Research 
Current research has proposed that a single class of genes may be responsible for regulating accessory fruit formation and ripening. A study using strawberries concluded that hormone signaling pathways involving gibberellic acid and auxin affect gene expression, and contribute to the initiation of accessory fruit development. Metabolic modifications in different developing accessory fruit tissues are due to the varied distributions of compounds such as triterpenoids and steroids.

See also
 Aggregate fruit
Compound fruit
Multiple fruit

References

Fruit morphology